= World Hip Hop Beats =

- Origin: Los Angeles, California
- Genres: Hip Hop
- Years active: 2012–Present
- Labels: World Hip Hop Beats
- Website: World Hip Hop Beats

World Hip Hop Beats is a hip hop production group from Los Angeles, California which specializes in the creation of instrumental music for educational use. The group has released two studio albums and five singles.

== Discography ==
- Beats & Instrumentals, Vol. 1 (2012)
- Simulation Theory (2012)
- Twenty Two (2013)
- Kong (2013)
- Zombie (2014)
- Imagination (2014)
- Hendrix (2015)
